Night Dancing is a jazz album by Joe Farrell on the Warner Bros. label. It was released in 1978.

Track listing

Side one
"Katherine" (Jeff Lorber) – 6:36
"Silver Lace" (Joe Farrell) – 8:15
"How Deep Is Your Love" (Robin Gibb, Barry Gibb, Maurice Gibb) – 4:19
"Come Rain or Come Shine" (Harold Arlen, Johnny Mercer) – 3:24

Side two
"Another Star" (Stevie Wonder) – 5:30
"Casa De Los Sospensos" (Joe Farrell) – 7:30
"Night Dancing" (Trevor Lawrence) – 5:49
"You're in My Heart (The Final Acclaim)" (Rod Stewart) – 3:13

Personnel
Joe Farrell – Soprano and tenor saxophone, flute
Herbie Hancock – Piano, electric piano
Victor Feldman – Piano, electric piano
Michael Boddicker – Synthesizer, Clavinet
Lee Ritenour – Guitar
Jay Graydon – Guitar
Richard Greene & Beryl Marriott – Violin, viola
Robert W. Daugherty – Bass
Abraham Laboriel – Bass
Mike Porcaro – Bass
Chuck Rainey – Bass
John Guerin – Drums
Jeff Porcaro – Drums
Harvey Mason, Sr. – Drums
Airto Moreira – Percussion, cuica
Paulinho Da Costa – Conga
Joe Romano – Tenor saxophone 
Oscar Brashear – Trumpet
Garnett Brown – Trombone
Quitman Dennis – Baritone saxophone
Chuck Findley – Trumpet
Lew McCreary – Bass trombone
Flora Purim – Vocals
Andrea Robinson – Vocals

Chart performance

References

1978 albums
Joe Farrell albums
Warner Records albums